Henry Kwasi Prempeh (born 27 March 1912) was a Ghanaian judge. He was a justice of the Supreme Court of Ghana from 1971 to 1972.

Early life and education
Prempeh was born on 27 March 1912 to Osei Tutu Agyeman Prempeh II, the 14th Asantehene or king of the Ashanti (Ruler of the Asante) at Seychelles Islands. He began his early education at King's College, Seychelles before moving to St. Cyprians School, Kumasi after his father was repatriated. He had his secondary education at Adisadel College and his tertiary education at King's College London.

Career
Prempeh was a registrar of the Asantehene court prior to entering King's College London in 1946 to study law. He was awarded his Bachelor of Laws (llb) degree in 1949. He entered private legal practice in Kumasi, and served as the president of the Ashanti Bar Association in 1957. In 1960, he was appointed justice of the High Court. He served on the High Court bench until 1964 when his appointment was revoked by the then president, Kwame Nkrumah with no reason given. He then returned to private practice after the revocation of his appointment. In 1971, he was appointed to the Supreme Court bench together with Samuel Azu Crabbe and Fred Kwasi Apaloo. He served in this capacity until 1972 when the Supreme Court was abolished by the then ruling military government, the National Redemption Council (NRC).

Personal life
His hobbies include walking, playing golf and gardening.

See also
List of judges of the Supreme Court of Ghana
Supreme Court of Ghana

References

1912 births
Possibly living people
Justices of the Supreme Court of Ghana
20th-century Ghanaian judges
Alumni of Adisadel College
Alumni of King's College London
Alumni of the University of London